Lucas Ángel Esquivel (born 14 October 2001) is an Argentine professional footballer who plays as a left-back for Unión Santa Fe.

Career
Esquivel is a product of the Unión Santa Fe youth system. He made the move into the first-team towards the end of 2020, initially going unused on the bench for a Copa Sudamericana defeat at home to Emelec on 29 October; a day after signing his first professional contract. His senior debut arrived days later, on 1 November, in a Copa de la Liga Profesional match with Arsenal de Sarandí; he started and played seventy-three minutes of a goalless home draw, before being subbed off for Claudio Corvalán.

Personal life
In September 2020, it was announced that Esquivel had tested positive for COVID-19 amid the pandemic; he isolated after showing symptoms.

Career statistics
.

Notes

References

External links

2001 births
Living people
Place of birth missing (living people)
Argentine footballers
Association football defenders
Unión de Santa Fe footballers